Alpha Chi Sigma is a professional fraternity specializing in the fields of the chemical sciences. It has both collegiate and professional chapters throughout the United States consisting of both men and women and numbering more than 70,000 members. The fraternity aims to bring together students and professionals pursuing a wide variety of chemistry-related careers.

History

Founding 
The Alpha Chi Sigma fraternity was organized at the University of Wisconsin–Madison by a group of undergraduates who were fellow students in chemistry at that time. Later documents set the date of founding as December 11, 1902. The original founders were:
 Raymond Tracy Conger
 Harold Everett Eggers
 Joseph Gerard Holty
 Alfred Emil Kundert
 Joseph Howard Mathews
 Edward Gustav Mattke
 Bart Eldred McCormick
 Frank Joseph Petura
 James Chisholm Silverthorn

Coat of arms 
The seven symbols that stretch the length of the coat of arms are the "seven metals of the Ancients": gold, silver, iron, mercury, tin, copper, and lead.  These symbols correspond to planets, gods, and days of the week.

Purpose 
The Three Objects of Alpha Chi Sigma:

 To bind its members with a tie of true and lasting friendship.
 To strive for the advancement of chemistry both as a science and as a profession.
 To aid its members by every honorable means in the attainment of their ambitions as chemists throughout their mortal lives.

The Five Obligations of a Member:

 That a member will remember the Objects of the Fraternity and endeavor always to further them.
 That a member will pay promptly all financial obligations.
 That a member will so act so as never to be a reproach to Alpha Chi Sigma.
 That a member will cheerfully fulfill any assigned fraternal tasks. 
 That a member will maintain as satisfactory a scholastic record as possible.

Famous Members

Nobel Prize in Chemistry 
 Petrus (Peter) Josephus Wilhelmus Debye, Tau '40 (1936)
"for his contributions to our knowledge of molecular structure through his investigations on dipole moments and on the diffraction of X-rays and electrons in gases."
 Glenn Theodore Seaborg, Beta Gamma '35 (1951)
"for [his] discoveries in the chemistry of the transuranium elements."
 Linus C. Pauling, Sigma '40 (1954)
"for his research into the nature of the chemical bond and its application to the elucidation of the structure of complex substances." 
 Vincent du Vigneaud, Zeta '30 (1955)
"for his work on biochemically important sulphur compounds, especially for the first synthesis of a polypeptide hormone."
 Willard F. Libby, Sigma '41 (1960)
"for his method to use carbon-14 for age determination in archaeology, geology, geophysics, and other branches of science."
 Lars Onsager, Chi '50 (1968)
"for the discovery of the reciprocal relations bearing his name, which are fundamental for the thermodynamics of irreversible processes." 
 Paul J. Flory, Tau '50 (1974)
"for his fundamental achievements, both theoretical and experimental, in the physical chemistry of the macromolecules."
 William N. Lipscomb, Alpha Gamma '39 (1976)
"for his studies on the structure of boranes illuminating problems of chemical bonding." 
 Herbert C. Brown, Beta Nu '60 (1979)
"for [his] development of the use of boron-containing compounds into important reagents in organic synthesis." 
 R. Bruce Merrifield, Beta Gamma '44 (1984)
"for his development of methodology for chemical synthesis on a solid matrix." 
 Elias J. Corey, Zeta '53 (1990)
"for developing new ways to synthesize complex molecules ordinarily found in nature."
 Rudolph A. Marcus, Zeta '55 (1992)
"for his contributions to the theory of electron transfer reactions in chemical systems."
 Alan G. MacDiarmid, Alpha '51 (2000)
"for the discovery and development of conductive polymers"
 Richard F. Heck, Beta Gamma '50 (2010)
"for palladium-catalyzed cross couplings in organic synthesis"
 Carolyn R. Bertozzi, Sigma '01 (2022)
"for the development of click chemistry and bioorthogonal chemistry"

Nobel Prize in Physiology or Medicine 
 Edward Adelbert Doisy, Zeta '43 (1943)
"for his discovery of the chemical nature of vitamin K."
 E. L. Tatum, Alpha '30 (1958)
"for [his] discovery that genes act by regulating definite chemical events." 
 Robert W. Holley, Zeta '40 (1968)
"for [his] interpretation of the genetic code and its functions in protein synthesis." 
 George H. Hitchings, Omicron '29 (1988)
"for [his] discoveries of Important Principles for Drug Treatment." 
 Paul C. Lauterbur, Gamma '49 (2003)
"for their discoveries concerning magnetic resonance imaging"

Nobel Prize in Physics 
 Raymond Davis Jr., Alpha Rho '35 (2002)
"for pioneering contributions to astrophysics, in particular for the detection of cosmic neutrinos."

Nobel Prize in Peace 
 Linus C. Pauling, Sigma '40 (1962)
"for warning of the dangers of radioactive fallout in nuclear weapons testing and war."

Priestley Medal 
 Farrington Daniels, Beta 1908, (1957). 1953 President of the American Chemical Society, solar and nuclear energy pioneer.
 Roger Adams, Zeta '12, (1946). Developed Adams' catalyst, 1935 president of the American Chemical Society, 1950 president of the American Association for the Advancement of Science.
 James Bryant Conant, Omicron '12, (1944). Early contributor to physical organic chemistry, President of Harvard University from 1933 to 1953, oversaw the Manhattan Project, winner of the Presidential Medal of Freedom.
 Joel Henry Hildebrand, Sigma 1913, (1962). Replaced nitrogen in scuba tanks with helium and oxygen, the American Chemical Society's Joel Henry Hildebrand is named for him, president of the Sierra Club from 1937 to 1940. Winner of virtually every chemical award except the Nobel Prize.
 Darleane Hoffman, Sigma 1988, (2000). Also winner of ACS Award in Nuclear Chemistry, US Medal of Science.
 Warren K. Lewis, Alpha Zeta 1925, (1947). Called Father of Modern Chemical Engineering. Also won first American Chemical Society of Award in Industrial and Engineering Chemistry, the AIChE Founders Award, and the Perkins Medal. Introduced the concept of the unit operation.
 M. Frederick Hawthorne, Beta Delta 1949 (2008) Noted Boron Chemist, Director of the International Institute of Nano and Molecular Medicine at the University of Missouri. Also won the King Faisal Award for Science.

Other notable brothers 
 Gilbert N. Lewis, Sigma 1913, known for dot diagrams of bonding,  thermodynamic activity, and acid/base theory
 Frederick Gardner Cottrell, Sigma 1917, Director of the US Bureau of Mines.
 Arnold Orville Beckman, Zeta 1921, inventor of pH meter and ultraviolet spectrometer. Member of the National Inventors Hall of Fame, winner of the National Medal of Technology and the National Medal of Science.
 Wallace Carothers, Zeta 1926, Inventor of nylon and neoprene.
 Thomas Midgley Jr., Alpha Delta 1936, inventor of Freon
 Mary L. Good, Beta Phi 1976, 1993 Under Secretary of Technology, 1987 president of the American Chemical Society
 F. Albert Cotton, Beta Eta 1978, noted transition metal chemist
 Dr. Donna J. Nelson, Beta Nu 1982, 2016 American Chemical Society President, Science Advisor for the AMC television show Breaking Bad, 2022 Council of Scientific Society Presidents Board Chair-Elect, National Organization for Women "Woman of Courage Award" 2004, Society for Advancement of Chicanos and Native Americans in Science "Distinguished Scientist of the Year" 2006, Nelson Diversity Surveys author

Collegiate chapters

Professional chapters and groups

See also 

 Professional fraternities and sororities

References 

 
Student organizations established in 1902
Professional fraternities and sororities in the United States
Professional Fraternity Association
1902 establishments in Wisconsin